Mekayla Diehl Eppers (née Diehl; born November 28, 1988) is an American beauty pageant titleholder. She was crowned Miss Indiana USA 2014 and later competed in Miss USA 2014, where she placed in the top twenty. In 2018, Diehl was crowned Mrs. America 2018 and went on to place in the top twelve in South Africa at the Mrs. World competition. Diehl is the first woman of Native American descent to represent Indiana at the Miss USA pageant.

Early life

Diehl was born in Elkhart, Indiana in 1988. She is descended from the Ojibwe tribe, a member of the Ontario-based Zhiibaahaasing First Nation through her mother. She was adopted and raised by her grandmother after being sexually abused by a family friend. She went on to graduate from White Pigeon High School in 2007 after having successful sports careers in basketball, volleyball, and track.

Career
Diehl graduated in 2011 from Albion College with a bachelor's degree of liberal arts in mass communication where she played on the volleyball team and track team. In June 2012 she competed in the Miss Indiana 2012 pageant where she placed second runner-up and won the "Joy of Life" award.  In October of that year she competed in the Miss Indiana USA 2013 pageant where she was a semi-finalist.

In 2012, Mekayla accepted a position at Froggy 102.7 WLEG in Goshen, Indiana as the production director and afternoon DJ until the station's format changed in 2013.

In October 2013, Diehl won the Miss Indiana USA 2014 title which qualified her to compete in the Miss USA 2014 pageant the following year, where she placed in the top twenty. She is the first contestant of Native American descent to represent Indiana at the Miss USA pageant.

Nia Sanchez, the winner of the 2014 pageant, stated that Diehl is no different than the other athletic pageant contestants she competed against. "I felt like this year we had a really healthy class of girls, and that’s what the pageant is about, not being skinny and having the clothes fall off your bones, but being fit, healthy and active. And Mekayla is," she said. "We were at the gym working out together. She was telling me how she does different sports. We all do." Diehl has ignited a wave of positivity encouraging women to be healthy and not go to extremes of having unhealthy habits to be skinny.

Though Diehl is celebrated for being a healthy role model encouraging young women to be active and healthy, a few critics created backlash by stating that even though she represents something new she isn't normal. Their main argument was that the average American woman, according to the Centers for Disease Control and Prevention, is 5-foot-3 and 166 pounds with a size 12 or 14 waist size and has a BMI of 33.

She received coverage from all the major networks, interviewed by Elisabeth Hasselbeck on Fox and Friends, The Today Show, Good Morning America, Entertainment Tonight. and WNDU

She went on to gain her real estate license with Century 21 Affiliated serving the Northern Indiana region. 
Mekayla competed and won the title of Mrs. Indiana America in April 2017 and went on to win Mrs. America 2018 in August at the Westgate in Las Vegas.

In December 2018, Mekayla launched her new pageant coaching business titled Reign Pageantry.

Personal life
In November 2015, she married Christopher Eppers of Elkhart, Indiana.

References

External links
 
 Mekayla Diehl Profile on missuniverse.com

1988 births
Albion College alumni
American beauty pageant winners
American female models
Female models from Indiana
Living people
Miss USA 2014 delegates
Mrs. America (contest) delegates
Native American female models
Ojibwe people
21st-century Native American women
21st-century Native Americans